is a Japanese photographer.

References

Japanese photographers
1974 births
Living people
Place of birth missing (living people)
Japanese women photographers
21st-century Japanese women artists
Date of birth missing (living people)